Poncha Springs is a Statutory Town in Chaffee County, Colorado, United States. The population was 737 at the 2010 census.

History
The first human inhabitants of the Poncha Springs area were Ute people, who used the region as camping grounds during the winter months. Following the Spanish exploration, French trappers and fur traders moved in. In 1855, Colonel Thomas T. Fauntleroy and the 1st Cavalry Regiment marched over Poncha Pass and engaged a group of Utes between present day Salida and Poncha Springs, during the Ute Wars.

Around 1860, prospectors began arriving, including Bob Hendricks and Nat Rich, who built the first cabin in town, which is still standing. Nat Rich's son, James, was the first white person born in Poncha Springs in 1867. That same year Poncha Springs was designated as an election precinct.

Indian agent John Burnett homesteaded with his wife, Minerva Maxwell Burnett, who was an early schoolteacher in Poncha Springs.
In 1866, Burnett constructed a log building on his ranch to serve as an Indian trading post. The Hutchinson and McPherson families also homesteaded the area around the same time. John McPherson purchased Nat Rich's squatting rights from Joe Hutchinson and built a grocery store.

Poncha Springs began to grow in the 1870s, and was incorporated on December 8, 1880. The Poncha Springs Schoolhouse, which is listed on the National Register of Historic Places and now serves as town hall, was completed in 1883.

Hot springs
The European discovery of the Poncha hot springs is widely disputed. Some historians believe Lt. Zebulon Pike, after whom Pikes Peak is named, made the discovery in 1806. Others credit frontiersman Kit Carson, who passed through Poncha Springs in 1832.
John Burnett, Henry Weber, and Paul Irvine built the first spring-fed bath in 1868 by digging a large pit, which they lined with logs to contain the water. The town flourished when the railroad passed through, and the springs became a popular attraction. Two hotels were constructed on the site, but both burned down. In 1904, a year after the last fire, the Holman family arrived to manage the springs. By then a hand-plastered rock pool, two cabins, two baths, and a sleeping room had been built.

The springs were operated by Donald Hartwich from 1927 to 1935, when the City of Salida had the W.P.A. pipe the water to the pool in Salida. The springs were capped with cement and have since become property of the City of Salida.

Geography
Poncha Springs is located in southern Chaffee County at  (38.513451, -106.075607).

Demographics

As of the census of 2000, there were 466 people, 202 households, and 136 families residing in the town. There were 226 housing units at an average density of 201 per square mile (78/km). The racial makeup of the town was 95.1% White, 0.6% Native American, 1.7% Asian, 0.2% Pacific Islander, 1.5% from other races, and 0.9% from two or more races. Hispanic or Latino of any race were 6.2% of the population.

There were 202 households, out of which 29.7% had children under the age of 18 living with them, 55.4% were married couples living together, 8.9% had a female householder with no husband present, and 32.2% were non-families. 27.2% of all households were made up of individuals, and 6.9% had someone living alone who was 65 years of age or older. The average household size was 2.31 and the average family size was 2.77.

In the town, the population was spread out, with 23.2% under the age of 18, 6.9% from 18 to 24, 27.3% from 25 to 44, 25.5% from 45 to 64, and 17.2% who were 65 years of age or older. The median age was 40 years. For every 100 females, there were 100.9 males. For every 100 females age 18 and over, there were 98.9 males.

The median income for a household in the town was $31,428, and the median income for a family was $36,000. Males had a median income of $30,417 versus $18,281 for females. The per capita income for the town was $16,864. About 7.4% of families and 10.8% of the population were below the poverty line, including 6.1% of those under age 18 and 16.2% of those age 65 or over.

Transportation
Poncha Springs calls itself "Crossroads of the Rockies" due to the intersection of two main thoroughfares in the town. US 50 runs through the town east-west, while US 285 runs through north-south.

Poncha Springs is part of Colorado's Bustang bus network. It is on the Alamosa-Pueblo Outrider bus line.

Tesla operates a supercharger station in the town.

See also

Outline of Colorado
Index of Colorado-related articles
State of Colorado
Colorado cities and towns
Colorado municipalities
Colorado counties
Chaffee County, Colorado

References

External links
Town of Poncha Springs official website
CDOT map of the Town of Poncha Springs
Poncha Springs information

Towns in Chaffee County, Colorado
Towns in Colorado